Albatros D.IX was a German prototype single-seat fighter built in early 1918. It differed from previous marks by using a simplified fuselage with a flat bottom and slab sides. The wings and tail were similar to those of the Albatros D.VII. Power was provided by a  Mercedes D.IIIa engine. The D.IX was armed with twin synchronised  LMG 08/15 machine guns.

The prototype exhibited disappointing performance and the project was discontinued.

Specifications

References

 Green, W. & Swanborough, G. (1994). The Complete Book of Fighters. London: Salamander Books.

External links
 

1910s German fighter aircraft
Biplanes
Single-engined tractor aircraft
D.09
Aircraft first flown in 1918